The 2011 NCAA Division I men's ice hockey tournament involved 16 schools in single-elimination play to determine the national champion of men's NCAA Division I college ice hockey. The tournament  began on March 25, 2011, and ended with the championship game on April 9, when the Minnesota–Duluth Bulldogs defeated the Michigan Wolverines 3–2.

Tournament procedure

The four regionals are officially named after their geographic areas.  The following are the sites for the 2011 regionals:
March 25 and 26
East Regional, Webster Bank Arena – Bridgeport, Connecticut (Hosts: Yale University and Fairfield University)
West Regional, Scottrade Center – St. Louis, Missouri (Host: Central Collegiate Hockey Association)

March 26 and 27
Northeast Regional, Verizon Wireless Arena – Manchester, New Hampshire (Host: University of New Hampshire)
Midwest Regional, Resch Center – Green Bay, Wisconsin (Host: Michigan Technological University)

Each regional winner will advance to the Frozen Four:
April 7 and 9
Xcel Energy Center – St. Paul, Minnesota (Host: University of Minnesota)

Qualifying teams
The at-large bids and seeding for each team in the tournament were announced on March 20. The Central Collegiate Hockey Association (CCHA) and Western Collegiate Hockey Association (WCHA), Hockey East, ECAC Hockey and Atlantic Hockey conference tournament winners all secure a spot in the tournament while other at large teams are chosen by the NCAA selection committee.

Number in parentheses denotes overall seed in the tournament.

Regionals
Note: * denotes overtime period(s)
All times are local (EDT/CDT).

East Regional – Bridgeport, Connecticut

* Denotes overtime periods

Regional semifinals

Regional final

Midwest Regional – Green Bay, Wisconsin

Regional semifinals

Regional final

West Regional – St. Louis, Missouri

* Denotes overtime periods

Regional semifinals

Regional final

Northeast Regional – Manchester, New Hampshire

* Denotes overtime periods

Regional semifinals

Regional final

Frozen Four – St. Paul, Minnesota

National Semifinals

National Championship

Record by conference

Media

Television
ESPN had US television rights to all games during the tournament. For the seventh consecutive year ESPN aired every game, beginning with the regionals, on ESPN, ESPN2, and ESPNU, and ESPN3.

Broadcast Assignments
Regionals
East Regional: Clay Matvick & Barry Melrose – Bridgeport, Connecticut
West Regional: Ben Holden & Sean Ritchlin – St Louis, Missouri
Northeast Regional: Justin Kutcher & Damian DiGiulian – Manchester, New Hampshire
Midwest Regional: Dan Parkhurst & Jim Paradise – Green Bay, Wisconsin

Frozen Four & Championship
Gary Thorne, Barry Melrose, & Clay Matvick – St. Paul, Minnesota

Radio
Westwood One used exclusive radio rights to air both the semifinals and the championship, AKA the "Frozen Four."
Sean Grande & Cap Raeder

All-Tournament Team

Frozen Four
G: Shawn Hunwick (Michigan)
D: Justin Faulk (Minnesota-Duluth)
D: Jon Merrill (Michigan)
F: Kyle Schmidt (Minnesota-Duluth)
F: J. T. Brown* (Minnesota-Duluth)
F: Ben Winnett (Michigan)
* Most Outstanding Player(s)

References

Tournament
NCAA Division I men's ice hockey tournament
NCAA Division I Men's Ice Hockey Tournament
NCAA Division I Men's Ice Hockey Tournament
21st century in Saint Paul, Minnesota
21st century in St. Louis
NCAA Division I Men's Ice Hockey Tournament
NCAA Division I Men's Ice Hockey Tournament
NCAA Division I Men's Ice Hockey Tournament
NCAA Division I Men's Ice Hockey Tournament
NCAA Division I Men's Ice Hockey Tournament
History of Green Bay, Wisconsin
Ice hockey competitions in Bridgeport, Connecticut
Ice hockey competitions in New Hampshire
Ice hockey competitions in St. Louis
Ice hockey competitions in Wisconsin
Sports in Green Bay, Wisconsin
Sports in Manchester, New Hampshire
Ice hockey competitions in Saint Paul, Minnesota